The Brookfield School District is a public school district located in Fairfield County, in Brookfield, Connecticut, United States. Brookfield has four public schools and six private schools. The District Superintendent is Dr. John Barile and the District Assistant Superintendent is Dr. Anna Mahon.

Private Schools
St. Joseph Elementary School
Christian Life Academy
Country Kids Child Care
Goddard School
Montessori Community School
Curtis School for Boys

Public Elementary Schools

Center Elementary School
Huckleberry Hill Elementary School

Middle school

Whisconier Middle School

High school

Brookfield High School

External links
 Brookfield Public Schools Website

References

Education in Fairfield County, Connecticut
School districts in Connecticut
Brookfield, Connecticut